Scoop is an upcoming film made for Netflix starring Gillian Anderson, Rufus Sewell, Billie Piper, and Keeley Hawes. Directed by Philip Martin, it is a dramatic retelling of the process of securing the 2019 BBC television interview of Prince Andrew by presenter and journalist Emily Maitlis and the production team at BBC Two news and current affairs programme Newsnight. The film is an adaptation by Peter Moffat of former Newsnight editor Sam McAlister’s book Scoops: Behind The Scenes of the BBC’s Most Shocking Interview.

Cast
Gillian Anderson as Emily Maitlis
Rufus Sewell as Prince Andrew
Billie Piper as Sam McAllister 
Keeley Hawes as Amanda Thirsk
Connor Swindells as Jae Donnelly 
Romola Garai as Esme Wren
Charity Wakefield as HRH Princess Beatrice
Lia Williams as Fran Unsworth

Synopsis
The behind-the-scenes story of the women who negotiated with the Buckingham Palace establishment to secure the ‘scoop of the decade’ that was the public catalyst for the downfall of the prince, in a televised interview which focused on Andrew’s relationship with the convicted pedophile Jeffrey Epstein and allegations of Andrew’s sexual assault of a minor which Andrew denies and in early 2022 settled out of a court for a £12 million settlement. The interview was later described as less a car-crash than “a plane crashing into an oil tanker, causing a tsunami, triggering a nuclear explosion.”

Production
An adaptation of the former Newsnight editor Sam McAlister’s book “Scoops: Behind The Scenes of the BBC’s Most Shocking Interviews.” by Peter Moffat for The Lighthouse Film & Television and Voltage TV was announced in July 2022. Moffat said the adaptation was concentrating on “about how the BBC’s Newsnight team got the scoop..[and].. Why did he agree to do it?’” It is directed by Philip Martin and produced by Hilary Salmon and Radford Neville for The Lighthouse and Sanjay Singhal for Voltage TV. Anderson, Sewell, Hawes and Piper were announced in the cast in February 2023. McAllister, who was in-part responsible for negotiating and booking the Prince said it was “a pinch myself moment” to be played by Piper. Hawes is to play Prince Andrew’s former Private Secretary Amanda Thirsk.

Filming
Principal photography commenced in 2023, ahead of an anticipated launch in 2024. Shots of Anderson in costume as Maitlis on set were revealed online in late February 2023.

References

External links
{{IMDb title|

Upcoming English-language films
Films directed by Philip Martin (director)